Greatest Hits was a compilation album by Sean Maguire. It was released by EMI Gold in 1998 just over a year after Sean had announced he was leaving the music industry to concentrate on acting. No new songs were on the album and it was released with no promotion. The album featured seven of his eight singles, some B-sides, album tracks and re-mixes. This is the only Sean Maguire compilation to date.

Track listing

Sean Maguire albums
1998 greatest hits albums